The Dean House is a historic house at 1520 Beech Street in Texarkana, Arkansas.  It is a two-story wood-frame house, built in 1911 for Thomas Mercer Dean, a local farmer and lumberman.  Its principal distinguishing feature is its large Colonial Revival portico, with paired two-story Tuscan columns supporting an elaborate entablature.  Porches wrap around the north and east sides of the house, and there is a porte-cochère at the southern corner.

The house was listed on the National Register of Historic Places in 1976, and it was included in the Beech Street Historic District in 2010.

See also
National Register of Historic Places listings in Miller County, Arkansas

References

{{Miller County, Arkansas]}}

Buildings and structures in Texarkana, Arkansas
Houses in Miller County, Arkansas
Houses completed in 1911
Houses on the National Register of Historic Places in Arkansas
Individually listed contributing properties to historic districts on the National Register in Arkansas
National Register of Historic Places in Miller County, Arkansas
Colonial Revival architecture in Arkansas